Jason Keough (born 21 November 1972) is an Australian former professional rugby league footballer who played in the 1990s. He played for Eastern Suburbs, South Sydney Rabbitohs, and Western Suburbs Magpies in the NSWRL/ARL/NRL competitions and for Paris Saint-Germain in the Super League.

Playing career
Keough was signed by the Eastern Suburbs in 1992. He made his first grade debut for the club in his side's 18–7 loss to the Balmain Tigers at the Sydney Football Stadium in round 9 of the 1993 NSWRL season . Keough spent two years at Easts making 23 appearances before switching to arch-rivals South Sydney. Keough played a total of six games for Souths over two years. He was contracted with the side in 1996 but only played for the reserve grade team. In 1997, Keough played one season with the now defunct Paris Saint-Germain rugby league team before returning to Australia where he finished his career with Western Suburbs.

References

1972 births
Western Suburbs Magpies players
South Sydney Rabbitohs players
Sydney Roosters players
Paris Saint-Germain Rugby League players
Australian rugby league players
Rugby league centres
Rugby league wingers
Living people